Martin Kröber (born 12 February 1992) is a German trade unionist and politician of the Social Democratic Party (SPD) who has been serving as a member of the Bundestag since 2021.

Political career 
Kröber was elected directly to the Bundestag in 2021, representing the Magdeburg district. In parliament, he has since been serving on the Committee on Transport and the Committee on Petitions.

Within his parliamentary group, Kröber belongs to the Parliamentary Left, a left-wing movement.

Other activities
 Federal Network Agency for Electricity, Gas, Telecommunications, Posts and Railway (BNetzA), Member of the Rail Infrastructure Advisory Council (since 2022)
 IG Metall, Member (since 2010)
 Railway and Transport Union (EVG), Member

References 

Living people
1992 births
Social Democratic Party of Germany politicians
Members of the Bundestag 2021–2025
21st-century German politicians